John Michael Brearley  (born 28 April 1942) is a retired English first-class cricketer who captained Cambridge University, Middlesex, and England. 

He captained the international side in 31 of his 39 Test matches, winning 18 and losing only 4.  He was the President of the Marylebone Cricket Club (MCC) in 2007–08. Since his retirement from professional cricket he has pursued a career as a writer and psychoanalyst, serving as President of the British Psychoanalytical Society 2008–10. In 2015, an article in the Bleacher Report ranked Brearley as England's greatest ever cricket captain.  

He is married to Mana Sarabhai who is from Ahmedabad, India and they have two children together.

Early life
Brearley was educated at the City of London School (where his father Horace, himself a first-class cricketer, was a master). While at St. John's College, Cambridge, Brearley excelled at cricket (he was then a wicketkeeper/batsman). After making 76 on his first-class debut as a wicketkeeper, he played for Cambridge University between 1961 and 1968 (captaining the side from 1964 onwards), first as an undergraduate in the Classical and Moral Sciences tripos, and then as a postgraduate.

While still at Cambridge, he was chosen for the Marylebone Cricket Club (MCC) tour to South Africa in 1964–65, and to captain the MCC Under-25 side in Pakistan in 1966–67, where he scored 312 not out against North Zone (his highest first-class score) and 223 against the Pakistan Under-25 side he ended the tour with 793 runs from six matches at an average of 132.

County cricket
From 1961 onwards, he played for Middlesex County Cricket Club, often opening the innings with Michael Smith. As captain between 1971 and 1982, he led Middlesex to County Championships in 1976, 1977 (jointly with Kent), 1980 and 1982; and he appeared in Free Foresters' very last first-class fixture, in 1968, keeping wicket and scoring 91.

International cricket

In part because of his pursuit of an academic career as a lecturer in philosophy at the University of Newcastle-upon-Tyne, which limited his cricketing activity in 1969 and 1970, Brearley was not selected for England until the age of 34 in 1976. His record in Test cricket as a batsman was modest (he averaged 22.88 in 66 Test innings, without a century), but he was an outstanding captain. He made his highest test score of 91 on tour against India in February 1977. Having previously kept wicket, he was also a fine slip catcher, usually at first slip. He took over as captain of England later in 1977.

His management skills (he was once described by Rodney Hogg as having "a degree in people") drew the best from the players in his team, although he was fortunate to be able to call on the services of Bob Willis, David Gower and Ian Botham at their peak. Brearley was captain during the infamous aluminium bat incident in 1979, when he objected to Dennis Lillee's use of a metal bat instead of one made of willow. On the same tour, he caused controversy at the end of an international one-day match against the West Indies at the Sydney Cricket Ground when he ordered all his fielders, including the wicketkeeper, to the boundary with three runs required off the last ball (this was legal by the rules of the time).

In all Botham and Willis took 262 wickets during the 31 test matches that Brearley captained. The importance of Willis in particular to England led Brearley into further controversies regarding the bowling of short-pitched deliveries at recognised tailend batsmen, during Pakistan’s tour of England in 1978, and more briefly, during England's 1978-9 tour of Australia. Brearley himself had been an innovator regarding cricket equipment himself, wearing a 'skull cap' under his England cap in 1977 (in the days before players wore helmets). It consisted of a plastic protector with two side pieces protecting his temples. It was later popularised by the Indian batsman Sunil Gavaskar.

Brearley captained England to the final of the 1979 Cricket World Cup, scoring 53 in the semi-final against New Zealand and 64 in the final against the West Indies. However, his opening partnership of 129 with Geoff Boycott in the final used up 38 of 60 allotted overs; although it was recognised that a potent pace attack of Andy Roberts, Michael Holding, Colin Croft and Joel Garner needed to be countered, the speed of the partnership greatly added to the pressure on the rest of the order. Garner bowled a spell of 5 wickets for 4 runs to induce a drastic collapse and hand the West Indies the match and the World Cup by 92 runs.

Having passed the England captaincy to Ian Botham in 1980 (losing his Test place in the process), Brearley returned as captain following Botham's resignation for the third Test against Australia at Headingley in 1981, going on to win the match and two of the remaining three matches of the series to win the Ashes 3–1.

His leadership benefited from Botham's recovered form following his winless captaincy record and his nosedive in form (he had made a pair in the second Test at Lord's) to take a first-innings 6 for 95 and score 50 and 149 not out in the third Test at Headingley, bowl a spell of 5 wickets for 1 run in the fourth Test at Edgbaston, score 118 from 102 balls in the fifth Test at Old Trafford, and take a 10-wicket match haul (6 for 125 and 4 for 128) in the sixth Test at the Oval. In spite of his limited reputation as an international batsman, Brearley also made an important if less high-profile contribution to the fourth test, scoring more runs than any other batsman (61) in a match which England won by 29 runs.

Post-cricket career
Brearley opposed sporting links with apartheid South Africa, seconding a motion to the MCC in 1968 calling for the cessation of tours until there was actual progress towards non-racial cricket. He seconded the motion from David Sheppard to the MCC, calling for the England tour to South Africa to be cancelled, and was a supporter of John Arlott who campaigned in The Guardian for the same objective.

He is now a psychoanalyst, psychotherapist (registered with the BPC), motivational speaker, and part-time cricket journalist for The Times. He was appointed an OBE in 1978, and published The Art of Captaincy in 1985. He published another book, On Form, in 2017.  In 1998, he became an Honorary Fellow of his Cambridge college, St. John's and in 2006 was awarded an honorary doctorate by Oxford Brookes University.

Brearley succeeded Doug Insole as President of MCC on 1 October 2007, and chose Derek Underwood to succeed him at the end of his term. He was president of the British Psychoanalytical Society, 2008–10.

References

Further reading

External links

1942 births
Living people
People from Harrow, London
Cricketers at the 1979 Cricket World Cup
English cricketers
English cricketers of 1946 to 1968
English cricketers of 1969 to 2000
England Test cricketers
England One Day International cricketers
England Test cricket captains
Middlesex cricket captains
International Cavaliers cricketers
Free Foresters cricketers
Wisden Cricketers of the Year
Cambridge University cricketers
Cricket historians and writers
Officers of the Order of the British Empire
People educated at the City of London School
Alumni of St John's College, Cambridge
Fellows of St John's College, Cambridge
Presidents of the Marylebone Cricket Club
Marylebone Cricket Club cricketers
Cambridgeshire cricketers
Gentlemen cricketers
Oxford and Cambridge Universities cricketers
Cricketers from Greater London
British psychoanalysts
Middlesex cricketers
T. N. Pearce's XI cricketers
Marylebone Cricket Club Under-25s cricketers
Marylebone Cricket Club President's XI cricketers